Paul Hawkins (born 16 April 1987) is a British humourist, published in Germany. His books include Denglisch for Better Knowers, and Erwachsenwerden für Anfänger (How to Deal with Adulthood).

Books 
Denglisch for Better Knowers, 2013, Ullstein
Gebrauchsanleitung Mensch: Bedienung, Wartung, Reparatur, 2014, C. H. Beck
iHuman: User Guide, 2016, Albatross Publishing
Erwachsenwerden für Anfänger: Die besten Tricks für Kindsköpfe, Chaoten und Spätzünder, 2016, C. H. Beck.

References 

1987 births
Living people
British humorists
British male writers